SM UC-56 was a German Type UC II minelaying submarine or U-boat in the German Imperial Navy during World War I. The U-boat was ordered on 12 January 1916, laid down on 4 March 1916, and was launched on 26 August 1916. She was commissioned into the German Imperial Navy on 18 December 1916 as SM UC-56. In six patrols UC-56 was credited with sinking one ship by torpedo: the British hospital ship . UC-56 suffered from mechanical breakdowns that prevented her from submerging. She put in at Santander, Spain, on 24 May 1918 and was interned there for the duration of the war.

Design
A German Type UC II submarine, UC-56 had a displacement of  when at the surface and  while submerged. The submarine was powered by two six-cylinder four-stroke diesel engines each producing  (a total of ), two electric motors producing , and two propeller shafts.

UC-56 was fitted with six  mine tubes, eighteen UC 200 mines, three  torpedo tubes (one on the stern and two on the bow), seven torpedoes, and one  Uk L/30 deck gun. Her complement was twenty-six crew members.

Fate
It was not capable of submerging again due to battle damage. On 24 May 1918, the U-boat arrived at Santander, Spain after a dangerous three-day voyage in a severely damaged condition. The crew of UC-56 were interned, the Germans reported to the Spanish authorities that their submarine had been seriously damaged by Christabel, and that they had had no choice but to take refuge in a neutral port.

Summary of raiding history

References

Notes

Citations

Bibliography

 
 

Ships built in Danzig
German Type UC II submarines
U-boats commissioned in 1916
World War I minelayers of Germany
World War I submarines of Germany
1916 ships